Aliabad-e Do may refer to:
 Aliabad-e Do, Bam